Laphria columbica is a species of robber flies in the family Asilidae.

References

columbica
Articles created by Qbugbot
Insects described in 1866